Janulis Spur is a rock spur which extends eastward from the Ford Massif between Green Valley and Aaron Glacier, in the Thiel Mountains of Antarctica. The name was proposed by Peter Bermel and Arthur B. Ford, co-leaders of the United States Geological Survey (USGS) Thiel Mountains party which surveyed these mountains in 1960–61. It is named for Lieutenant George Janulis, a pilot with U.S. Navy Squadron VX-6, who flew the USGS party into the Thiel Mountains.

References

Ridges of Ellsworth Land